In the Historia Augusta, Postumus the Younger figures as one of the so-called Thirty Tyrants who usurped power against the Roman Emperor Gallienus. 
According to the pseudo-historical list of 'Thirty Tyrants', the Emperor of the Gallic Empire Postumus had a son, also called Postumus, whom he nominated to be first caesar, and later even augustus and co-ruler. Postumus the Younger would have been killed together with his father in 268, during the rebellion of Laelianus (called Lollianus in the Historia).

The historian J. F. Drinkwater dismisses the Historia Augusta'''s reference to Postumus the Younger as a "fiction". There are no references to any son of Postumus on coins or inscriptions from the period.

The author(s) of the Historia asserts that Postumus the Younger was a skilled rhetor, and that his Controversiae were included among Quintilian's Declamationes''.

References 

268 deaths
Gallienus usurpers
Thirty Tyrants (Roman)
Gallic emperors
Year of birth unknown
Postumus